Thomas Day (July 6, 1777 – March 1, 1855) was an American lawyer, politician, and jurist who served as the secretary of the state of Connecticut from 1810 to 1835.

Early life and education 
Day was born in New Preston, Connecticut, in 1777, a descendant of Robert Day, one of the founders of Hartford, Connecticut. Day graduated from Yale College in 1797 and studied law at Litchfield Law School. From September 1798 to September 1799, was a tutor in Williams College. Day read law with Daniel Dewey. He was admitted to the bar in December 1799, and began practice in Hartford.

Career 
In 1809, Day was appointed assistant secretary of the state of Connecticut and in 1810 secretary, an office which he retained until 1835.

In May 1815, he became associate judge of the county court of Hartford, acting in this capacity, with the exception of one year, until May 1825, when he was made chief judge of that court, and so continued until June. 1833. He was a judge of the city court of Hartford from 1818–31 and contributed to city statutes of 1808, 1821, and 1824. He reported the decisions of the court from 1805 until 1853, which were published in twenty volumes.

He also edited several English law journals, amounting all together to forty volumes, in which he introduced notices of American decisions, and also of later English cases. He was an original member of the Connecticut Historical Society, of which he was president from 1839 until his death.

He was the brother of Yale College president Jeremiah Day.

References

1777 births
1855 deaths
Litchfield Law School alumni
Connecticut state court judges
Yale College alumni

Williams College people
People from New Preston, Connecticut
People from Hartford, Connecticut
Politicians from Hartford, Connecticut
Connecticut lawyers
Secretaries of the State of Connecticut
Lawyers from Hartford, Connecticut